Gertrude Olmstead (November 13, 1897 – January 18, 1975) was an American actress of the silent era. She appeared in 56 films between 1920 and 1929. Her last name was sometimes seen as Olmsted.

Career
Olmstead was born in Chicago, Illinois, and was noticed after winning a 5,900-entrant contest to represent "The Spirit of America" at the 1920 Elks Club national convention. The victory included an opportunity to receive a $10,000 one-year contract to appear in films.

Olmstead initially was signed by Universal Motion Picture company. Her first film was Tipped Off (1920), following which she became the leading lady in western films that starred Hoot Gibson. She appeared in her first credited film role in the 1921 film The Fox. She obtained several more roles that same year, appearing in nine films in 1921, and another five in 1922. She appeared in 17 more films by the time she received what is today her best-known role, opposite Rudolph Valentino in the 1925 film Cobra.

Throughout the silent film era her career thrived. From 1925 through 1929 she appeared in twenty eight films, most often portraying the heroine. With the advent of sound film her career stalled, and she retired from acting in 1929.

Personal life and death
In 1926 she met MGM director Robert Z. Leonard and they were married in Santa Barbara on June 8 of that year. Leonard and Olmstead remained married until his death in 1968.

After Leonard's death, Olmstead remained in the Los Angeles area, and died in Beverly Hills on January 18, 1975. She is interred at Glendale's Forest Lawn Memorial Park Cemetery, near her husband.

Partial filmography

 Tipped Off (1920, Short) - Marion Ross
 The Driftin' Kid (1921, Short)
 Sweet Revenge (1921, Short)
 Kickaroo (1921, Short)
 The Fightin' Fury (1921, Short)
 Out o' Luck (1921, Short)
 The Big Adventure (1921) -  Sally
 The Fighting Lover (1921) - Jean Forsdale
 The Fox (1921) - Stella Fraser
 Shadows of Conscience (1921) - Winifred Coburn
 The Scrapper (1922) - Eileen McCarthy
 The Adventures of Robinson Crusoe (1922, Serial)
 The Loaded Door (1922) - Molly Grainger
 Fighting Blood (1923) - Minor Role (uncredited)
 Trilby (1923) - Miss Bagot
 Cameo Kirby (1923) - Adele Randall
 George Washington Jr. (1924) - Dolly Johnson
 Ladies to Board (1924)
 A Girl of the Limberlost (1924) - Edith Carr
 Babbitt (1924) - Eunice Littlefield
 Lovers' Lane (1924) - Mary Larkin
 Empty Hands (1924) - Typsy
 Life's Greatest Game (1924) - Nora Malone
 The Monster (1925) - Betty Watson
 California Straight Ahead (1925) - Betty Browne
 Time, the Comedian (1925) - Ruth Dakon
 Cobra (1925) - Mary Drake
 Sweet Adeline (1926) - Adeline
 Torrent (1926) - Remedios
 Monte Carlo (1926) - Sally Roxford
 The Boob (1926) - Amy
 Puppets (1926) - Angela
 The Cheerful Fraud (1926) - Ann Kent
 Mr. Wu (1927) - Hilda Gregory
 The Callahans and the Murphys (1927) - Monica Murphy
 Becky (1927) - Nan Estabrook
 Buttons (1927) - Ruth Stratton
 A Woman Against the World (1928) - Bernice Crane, Bride
 The Cheer Leader (1928) - Jean Howard
 Sporting Goods (1928) - Alice Elliott
 Bringing Up Father (1928) - Ellen
 Green Grass Widows (1928) - Betty Worthing
 Hit of the Show (1928) - Kathlyn Carson
 Midnight Life (1928) - Betty Brown
 Sweet Sixteen (1928) - Patricia Perry
 The Passion Song (1928) - Elaine Van Ryn
 Hey Rube! (1928) - Lutie
 The Lone Wolf's Daughter (1929) - Helen Fairchild
 Sonny Boy (1929) - Mary
 The Time, the Place and the Girl (1929) - Mae Ellis
 The Show of Shows (1929) - Performer in 'Bicycle Built for Two' Number

References

External links

1904 births
1975 deaths
Actresses from Chicago
American film actresses
American silent film actresses
20th-century American actresses
Burials at Forest Lawn Memorial Park (Glendale)